FK Krajina Banja Luka (Serbian Cyrillic: ФК Kpajинa Бaњa Лукa) is a football club from the city of Banja Luka, in the entity of Republika Srpska, Bosnia and Herzegovina.  The club competes in the country's fourth level Regional League RS - West.

Club seasons
Source:

References

External sources
 Club at BiHsoccer.

Football clubs in Republika Srpska
Football clubs in Bosnia and Herzegovina
Sport in Banja Luka
Association football clubs established in 1973
1973 establishments in Bosnia and Herzegovina